"Look Away" is a 1988 song by the American rock band Chicago.

Look Away may also refer to:

Songs
"Look Away" (Big Country song), 1986
"Look Away" (Darude song), 2019 song that represented Finland in the Eurovision Song Contest 2019
"Look Away", 1994 song by Hootie & The Blowfish from their album Cracked Rear View
"Look Away", 1996 song by Iggy Pop from his album Naughty Little Doggie
"Lookaway", 1996 song by Sepultura from their album Roots
"Lookaway", 2010 song by James from their album The Morning After
"Look Away", 1966 song by The Spencer Davis Group from their album The Second Album
"Look Away", theme song for the 2017 TV series A Series of Unfortunate Events, by Neil Patrick Harris
"Look Away", 2018 song by Old Crow Medicine Show from their album Volunteer
"Look Away", 2019 song by Stephen Puth

Other
Look Away!, album by Doc and Merle Watson
Look Away + 4, EP and its title song from Apples in Stereo
Look Away, 1973 play by Jerome Kilty
Look Away (2018 film), a Canadian film written and directed by Assaf Bernstein
Look Away (2021 film), a film by Sky Documentaries about sexual abuse in rock music industry